Mauricio Castillo Moya  (born 1982), known as Chinoy, is a Chilean singer-songwriter who has released two solo albums. Chinoy's androgynous voice, lyrics, poetics and iconic guitar technique have been compared to those of Bob Dylan by the Chilean media and his style has been described as trova, indie folk and folk punk.

Early life
Chinoy was born in San Antonio, a commune of Valparaíso, Chile, where he founded the punk band Don Nadie and opened for the Argentine punk band Loquero in 2005. Loquero then invited him to spend a season in La Plata, Argentina. In 2007, he moved to Valparaiso where he studied for a short time and performed in local bars. It was there that Manuel García saw him perform and invited Chinoy to open for him in Valparaiso and Santiago. During 2007, Chinoy performed at Concepción, Puerto Montt, Punta Arenas, Valparaíso and Santiago and his song Carne de gallina appeared on the compilation album Escuelas de Rock 1er disco bicentenario (2007).

Musical career
In 2008, Chinoy came to the attention of award-winning filmmaker Andrés Wood, who asked him to write the theme song for his movie La Buena Vida.

In 2009, he released his debut full-length album, Que salgan los dragones, on the record label Quemasucabeza. In October 2010, he began a national tour of Chile taking in Santiago, Talca, Chillán and Concepción. In January 2012, he performed at the opening ceremony of Chile's Viña del Mar International Book Festival and by January 2013, his MySpace page had more than 800,000 views.

Discography
 2009 - Que salgan los dragones
 2010 - Chinoy en Bogotá

Soundtracks
 2008 - La Buena Vida

References

External links
Official site on MySpace
Movie Video "La buena vida"
Video Gallery

Chilean male guitarists
21st-century Chilean male singers
Living people
1982 births
21st-century guitarists